is a passenger railway station in located in the city of Iwade, Wakayama Prefecture, Japan, operated by West Japan Railway Company (JR West).

Lines
Iwade Station is served by the Wakayama Line, and is located 74.2 kilometers from the terminus of the line at Ōji Station.

Station layout
The station consists of two opposed side platforms connected by a footbridge. The station has a Midori no Madoguchi staffed ticket office.

Platforms

Adjacent stations

|-

History
It was promoted to a full station and renamed  on March 1, 1902, and renamed to its present name a month later. The line was sold to the Kansai Railway in 1904, which was subsequently nationalized in 1907. With the privatization of the Japan National Railways (JNR) on April 1, 1987, the station came under the aegis of the West Japan Railway Company.

Passenger statistics
In fiscal 2019, the station was used by an average of 1891 passengers daily (boarding passengers only).

Surrounding Area
Iwade City Hall
 Ōmiya Shrine
Wakayama Prefectural Naga High Schoole

See also
List of railway stations in Japan

References

External links

 Iwade Station Official Site

Railway stations in Wakayama Prefecture
Railway stations in Japan opened in 1900
Iwade, Wakayama